Various Y-DNA haplogroups have differing frequencies within each ethnolinguistic group in the Caucasus region.



Table

The table below lists the frequencies – identified by major studies – of various haplogroups amongst selected ethnic groups from the Caucasus. The first two columns list the ethnic and linguistic affiliations of the individuals studied, the third column gives the sample size studied, and the other columns give the percentage of the particular haplogroup.

Language family abbreviations:  IE Indo-European  NEC Northeast Caucasian   NWC Northwest Caucasian  SC South Caucasian

See also
Caucasus
Peoples of the Caucasus
Languages of the Caucasus
Y-DNA haplogroups by groups

Y-DNA haplogroups in populations of Europe
Y-DNA haplogroups in populations of the Near East
Y-DNA haplogroups in populations of North Africa
Y-DNA haplogroups in populations of Central and North Asia
Y-DNA haplogroups in populations of South Asia
Y-DNA haplogroups in populations of Sub-Saharan Africa
Y-DNA haplogroups in populations of East and Southeast Asia
Y-DNA haplogroups in populations of Oceania
Y-DNA haplogroups in indigenous peoples of the Americas

Notes

References

Sources

External links
Y-DNA Ethnographic and Genographic Atlas and Open-Source Data Compilation

Causasus
Genetic history of Europe